Rettenbach is a municipality  in the district of Günzburg in Bavaria in Germany. The following Gemarkungen exist: Harthausen, Remshart, Rettenbach.

References

Populated places in Günzburg (district)